The Central Highlands Football League is an Australian Rules Football League in the Ballarat region.  The league coordinates Senior, Reserve, Under 18, Under 15 and Under 12 grades.

History
The CHFL was formed in 1979 as a merger of the Clunes FL and the Ballarat Bacchus Marsh FL.  In 2011 the league admitted four new clubs from the defunct Lexton Plains Football League, bringing the total number of clubs to 18. In 2014 Illabarook changed its name to Smythesdale to reflect the town it plays its home games.

Central Highlands FL Clubs

Former Clubs

Seniors Premierships

1979 Clunes
1980 Ballan
1981 Ballan
1982 Waubra
1983 Wendouree
1984 Darley
1985 Hepburn
1986 Hepburn
1987 Creswick
1988 Gordon
1989 Hepburn
1990 Springbank
1991 Bungaree
1992 Newlyn
1993 Clunes
1994 Dunnstown
1995 Beaufort
1996 Beaufort
1997 Clunes
1998 Dunnstown
1999 Dunnstown
2000 Springbank
2001 Springbank
2002 Buninyong
2003 Newlyn
2004 Hepburn
2005 Hepburn
2006 Waubra
2007 Daylesford
2008 Hepburn
2009 Daylesford
2010 Hepburn
2011 Waubra
2012 Daylesford
2013 Hepburn
2014 Bungaree
2015 Springbank
2016 Springbank
2017 Hepburn
2018 Beaufort
2019 Waubra
2020 League in recess due to COVID19 pandemic 
2021 League in recess due to COVID19 pandemic 
2022 Gordon

Statistics

2011 Ladder

2012 Ladder

2013 Ladder

2014 Ladder

External links
 Gameday website
 Central Highlands FL on Country Footy Scores

Ballarat
Australian rules football competitions in Victoria (Australia)
Sports leagues established in 1979
1979 establishments in Australia